The Ladinian is a stage and age in the Middle Triassic series or epoch. It spans the time between  Ma and ~237 Ma (million years ago). The Ladinian was preceded by the Anisian and succeeded by the Carnian (part of the Upper or Late Triassic).

The Ladinian is coeval with the Falangian regional stage used in China.

Stratigraphic definitions

The Ladinian was established by Austrian geologist Alexander Bittner in 1892. Its name comes from the Ladin people that live in the Italian Alps (in the Dolomites, then part of Austria-Hungary).

The base of the Ladinian Stage is defined as the place in the stratigraphic record where the ammonite species Eoprotrachyceras curionii first appears or the first appearance of the conodont Budurovignathus praehungaricus. The global reference profile for the base (the GSSP) is at an outcrop in the river bed of the Caffaro river at Bagolino, in the province of Brescia, northern Italy. The top of the Ladinian (the base of the Carnian) is at the first appearance of ammonite species Daxatina canadensis.

The Ladinian is sometimes subdivided into two subages or substages, the Fassanian (early or lower) and the Longobardian (late or upper). The Ladinian contains four ammonite biozones, which are evenly distributed among the two substages:
zone of Frechites regoledanus
zone of Protrachyceras archelaus
zone of Protrachyceras gredleri
zone of Eoprotrachyceras curionii

Ladinian life

Notable formations 

 Bukobay Svita* (Russia)
 Erfurt Formation / Lower Keuper (Germany)
 Jilh Formation (Saudi Arabia)
 Meride Limestone (Switzerland and Italy)
 Upper Muschelkalk (central Europe)
 Perledo-Varenna Formation (Italy)
 Prosanto Formation (Switzerland)
 Lower Santa Maria Formation* (late Ladinian - early Carnian) (Rio Grande do Sul, Brazil)
 Zhuganpo Formation / Zhuganpo Member of the Falang Formation (late Ladinian - early Carnian) (Guizhou and Yunnan, China)

* Tentatively assigned to the Ladinian; age estimated primarily via terrestrial tetrapod biostratigraphy (see Triassic land vertebrate faunachrons)

References

Notes

Literature
; 2005: The Global boundary Stratotype Section and Point (GSSP) of the Ladinian Stage (Middle Triassic) at Bagolino (Southern Alps, Northern Italy) and its implications for the Triassic time scale, Episodes 28(4), pp. 233–244.
; 2004: A Geologic Time Scale 2004, Cambridge University Press.

External links
GeoWhen Database - Ladinian 
Upper Triassic and Lower Triassic timescales, at the website of the subcommission for stratigraphic information of the ICS
Norges Network of offshore records of geology and stratigraphy: Stratigraphic charts for the Triassic,  and 

 
02
Geological ages
Triassic geochronology